The 2015 AFC Cup Final was the final match of the 2015 AFC Cup, the 12th edition of the AFC Cup, a football competition organized by the Asian Football Confederation (AFC) for clubs from 'developing countries' in Asia according to the Vision Asia plan.

The final was contested as a single match between Tajikistani team Istiklol and Malaysian team Johor Darul Ta'zim. The match was hosted by Istiklol at the Pamir Stadium in Dushanbe on 31 October 2015. Leandro Velázquez scored the only goal in a match for Johor Darul Ta'zim, who won the match 1–0 and clinched their first title.

Venue

The Pamir Stadium is a multi-use stadium in Dushanbe, Tajikistan. It is the home stadium of Istiklol and holds 24,000 spectators.

Background
Istiklol qualified for the 2015 AFC Cup group stage as the 2014 Tajik League and 2014 Tajik Cup winners. This was their first appearance in the AFC Cup.

Johor Darul Ta'zim qualified for the 2015 AFC Champions League qualifying play-off as the 2014 Malaysia Super League champions, but failed to advance to the AFC Champions League group stage, and entered the AFC Cup group stage. This was their second appearance in the AFC Cup.

Both teams reached the AFC Cup final for the first time, and Johor Darul Ta'zim was the first team from East Asia Zone to reach the final.

Road to final

Note: In all results below, the score of the finalist is given first (H: home; A: away).

Rules
The final was played as a single match, with the host team decided by draw. If tied after regulation, extra time and, if necessary, penalty shoot-out would be used to decide the winner.

Match

References

External links
AFC Cup, the-AFC.com

Final
AFC Cup finals
International club association football competitions hosted by Tajikistan
FC Istiklol matches
Johor Darul Ta'zim F.C. matches